The eyespot skate (Atlantoraja cyclophora) is a species of fish in the family Arhynchobatidae. It is found in Argentina, Brazil, and Uruguay. Its natural habitats are open seas and shallow seas.

Sources 

Atlantoraja
Fish described in 1903
Taxonomy articles created by Polbot